FK Staiceles Bebri is a Latvian football club. They compete in the second-highest division of Latvian football (1. līga). It is based in Staicele. In the 2014 season they finished 2nd in the Latvian 2. līga and were promoted to 1. līga also receiving a license for participation at that level.

References

External links 
Official Twitter page 
Soccerway profile 

Football clubs in Latvia
Association football clubs established in 1994
1994 establishments in Latvia
Limbaži Municipality